Rosa Albach-Retty (born Rosa Clara Franziska Helene Retty; 26 December 1874 – 26 August 1980) was an Austrian film and stage actress.

Life
Born into a well-known family of Austrian actors, she was the daughter of actor and director Rudolf Retty. Trained by her father, she began her stage career in 1890 at the Deutsches Theater and the Lessing Theater in Berlin, where she successfully performed in the title role of Minna von Barnhelm. She was also known for breeches roles in Little Lord Fauntleroy and The Merchant of Venice. In 1895, she went to the Volkstheater in Vienna and in 1903 joined the Burgtheater ensemble, where she received the title of Hofschauspielerin (Actress of the Court) in 1905. She became an honorary member of the Burgtheater in 1928 and in 1958 she gave her final performance.

She was married to the Austro-Hungarian Army officer Karl Albach; she was the mother of Wolf Albach-Retty (1906–1967), an Austrian movie actor who married German movie actress Magda Schneider in 1937. She thereby was the grandmother of actress Romy Schneider and great-grandmother of actress Sarah Biasini.

Albach-Retty made her first film appearance in 1930, in Georg Jacoby's Money on the Street, and made her last appearance in the 1955 remake The Congress Dances directed by Franz Antel. She died in 1980 at the age of 105, not long after she had published her autobiography So kurz sind 100 Jahre for her hundredth birthday. Her grave of honour and that of her son is located in the Vienna Central Cemetery (Group 32 C, Number 50).

Ties to the Nazis 
The proximity of Rosa Albach-Retty to the NS Regime is well documented. The annexation of Austria to Nazi Germany in 1938 was celebrated by her in the Kleine Volks-Zeitung. Rosa Albach-Retty's membership in the NSDAP is not proven, but she and her husband were supporting members of the SS. As a celebrity of the public and a self-confessed admirer of Hitler, Rosa Albach-Retty was courted by the Nazi cultural policy and included in the so-called "God-privileged List" of the National Socialists. 

None of this did anything to diminish the esteem in which Albach-Retty was held after the end of the Nazi regime, as the awards she received after 1945 prove. Even a Viennese municipal building was named after her: the Rosa-Albach-Retty-Hof in the 19th district, built in the 1970s.

Selected filmography
 Money on the Street (1930)
 Episode (1935)
 Maria Ilona (1939)
 Hotel Sacher (1939)
 Whom the Gods Love (1942)
 Vienna 1910 (1943)
 Maria Theresa (1951)
 Adventure in Vienna (1952)
 The Spendthrift (1953)
 The Congress Dances (1955)
Klaus Peter Dencker in conversation with Rosa Albach-Retty. A production of Saarländischer Rundfunk / Television (45 minutes) (1979)

Decorations and awards
 1955: Grand Decoration of Honour for Services to the Republic of Austria
 1958: Kainz Medal
 1963: Austrian Cross of Honour for Science and Art, 1st class
 1977: Grand Decoration of Honour in Silver for Services to the Republic of Austria

Literatur 
 Rosa Albach-Retty: So kurz sind hundert Jahre. Erinnerungen. Aufgezeichnet von Gertrud Svoboda-Srncik. Herbig, Munich Berlin 1978, 
 Robert Kittler: Rosa Albach-Retty. Ein Leben für das Theater. Diss. Univ. Wien, Vienna 1958
 Oliver Rathkolb: Führertreu und gottbegnadet. Künstlereliten im Dritten Reich. Österreichischer Bundesverlag, Vienna1991, 
 Robert Teichl: Österreicher der Gegenwart. Lexikon schöpferischer und schaffender Zeitgenossen. Verlag der Österreichischen Staatsdruckerei, Vienna 1951
 Jürgen Trimborn: Romy und ihre Familie. Droemer, Munich 2008,

References

External links

Rosa Albach-Retty on filmportal.de
 
Rosa Albach-Retty in the Vienna History Wiki
 Archivaufnahmen mit Rosa Albach-Retty im Onlinearchiv der Österreichischen Mediathek (Rezitation, Interview …)

 Recordings with Rosa Albach-Retty in the Online Archive of the Österreichische Mediathek (in German). Retrieved 29 July 2019

1874 births
1980 deaths
Austrian film actresses
Austrian stage actresses
Austrian centenarians
Recipients of the Austrian Cross of Honour for Science and Art, 1st class
Recipients of the Grand Decoration for Services to the Republic of Austria
20th-century Austrian actresses
Women centenarians